Land Trust Alliance is a nature conservation organization, based in Washington, D.C. The Alliance represents many land trusts across the United States.

History
Originally formed as the Land Trust Exchange in Boston on February 22, 1982, Allan Spader was named its inaugural director. In 1990, the name of the organization was changed to the Land Trust Alliance and was moved to Washington, D.C.

The Land Trust Alliance has sponsored "Rally," a yearly conference of conservation professionals, since 1985.

In 2012, the Land Trust Alliance set up an insurance company to assist regional land trusts with the legal defense of conservation easements.

In 2021, the Land Trust Alliance expressed support for the 117th United States Congress' proposed "Charitable Conservation Easement Program Integrity Act", which is intended to prevent improper tax deductions for land trusts and encourage legitimate charitable contributions.

References

External links

Environmental organizations based in Washington, D.C.
Land trusts in the United States
Organizations established in 1982